Pectenocypris nigra is a species of small ray-finned fish from the minnow and carp family, Cyprinidae. It is known only from the very acidic, peaty swamps in central Sumatra. It has a blackish strip along the flanks of its body which is unique in the genus Pectenocypris.

References

Pectenocypris
Fish described in 2016